Aagantuk is a 2023 Gujarati thriller film directed by Naitik Raval. It stars Utsav Naik  Hiten Kumar & Netri Trivedi in lead roles. It is produced by Naitik Raval, Utsav Naik, Rishi Vyas and Shyam Nair, and distributed by Rupam Entertainment Pvt. Ltd. The music is composed by Tapan Jyoti Dutta and Soham Naik. It was released on 17 December 2023.

Cast 
 Utsav Naik 
 Hiten Kumar
 Netri Trivedi
 Sonali Lele Desai
 Shriya Tiwari 
 Rishi Vyas

Production 
It is produced under the banner of filmustav production and gallops talkies. The music of the film has given by Tapan Jyoti Dutta and song Composed by debutant Soham Naik, and  emerging costume designer Priyanka Trivedi has designed the costume of the film. Kajal Hemal Mehta and Naitik Raval wrote  screenplay and dialogues.

Soundtrack

Tracklist

Marketing and release 
The release date was announced on 25 December 2022. The trailer was released on 30 January 2023. The film was released on 17 February 2023. Shemaroo Entertainment has acquired the music rights of the film. Colors Gujarati did marketing and promotion.

See also
 List of Gujarati films of 2023

References

External links 
 

2023 films
2020s Gujarati-language films
Films shot in Gujarat